The 2010 Omloop Het Nieuwsblad cycle race took place on 27 February 2010. It was the 65th edition of the international classic Omloop Het Nieuwsblad. The race was the first 1.HC event in the 2010 UCI World Ranking.

Results

Omloop Het Nieuwsblad – Men's race
Omloop
Omloop Het Nieuwsblad
Omloop Het Nieuwsblad